Maccabi Ahva Yarka,, is an Israeli football club based in Yarka. The club played in Liga Gimel Upper Galilee division during the 2015–16 season.

History
The club was founded in 2013, replacing the former senior football club in Yarka, Otzma Bnei Yarka, which was closed in 2010. In its first season in Liga Gimel the club finished fourth, but achieved less success since, finishing 10th in its second season and 8th in its third.

External links
Maccabi Ahva Yarka The Israel Football Association 
Facebook Page

References

Yarka
Association football clubs established in 2013
Association football clubs disestablished in 2019
2013 establishments in Israel
2019 disestablishments in Israel
Druze community in Israel
Yarka